Monterey Moods is an album by the Gerald Wilson Orchestra recorded in 2007 and released on the Mack Avenue label.

Reception

AllMusic rated the album with 4 stars; in his review, Michael G. Nastos noted: "The music is for the most part punchy, vital, and alive with the spirit of the breezy, ocean-splashed, spacious West Coast... It's easy to hear Wilson at the peak of his very formidable powers, and this recording is highly recommended for those who enjoy the modern mainstream big-band sound of now".
The Guardian's review by John Fordham said "Gerald Wilson has confirmed the awesome firepower he still commands - both as a writer and a hirer of some of the best soloists". In JazzTimes Thomas Conrad wrote: "This album lacks the sweep and majesty of Wilson’s best recordings of the ’60s and ’70s, but the charts are graceful, the section work is clean, and the joy is real". On All About Jazz Jack Bowers noted: "the 89-year-old dean of American Jazz composers has scored another triumph, saluting the festival's golden anniversary with a picturesque seven-part suite, Monterey Moods, that musically epitomizes the scope and character of that annual event".

Track listing 
All compositions by Gerald Wilson except where noted.
 "Monterey Moods Suite": 
 "Allegro" - 6:12	
 "Jazz Swing Waltz" - 9:09	
 "Ballad" - 7:09	
 "Latin Swing" - 11:36	
 "Blues" - 10:00	
 "Bass Solo" - 2:27	
 "Hard Swing" - 1:40	
 "I Concentrate on You" (Cole Porter) - 6:00	
 "The Mini Waltz" - 5:26

Personnel 
Gerald Wilson - arranger, conductor
Hubert Laws - flute
Jon Faddis, Frank Greene, Sean Jones, Jimmy Owens, Terell Stafford - trumpet, flugelhorn
Jay Ashby, Luis Bonilla, Douglas Purviance, Dennis Wilson - trombone
Antonio Hart, Steve Wilson - alto saxophone, soprano saxophone, flute
Ron Blake, Kamasi Washington - tenor saxophone
Renee Rosnes - piano
Anthony Wilson - guitar 
Peter Washington, Todd Coolman - bass 
Lewis Nash - drums

References 

Gerald Wilson albums
2007 albums
Mack Avenue Records albums
Albums arranged by Gerald Wilson
Albums conducted by Gerald Wilson